Lead (82Pb) has four stable isotopes: 204Pb, 206Pb, 207Pb, 208Pb. Lead-204 is entirely a primordial nuclide and is not a radiogenic nuclide. The three isotopes lead-206, lead-207, and lead-208 represent the ends of three decay chains: the uranium series (or radium series), the actinium series, and the thorium series, respectively; a fourth decay chain, the neptunium series, terminates with the thallium isotope 205Tl. The three series terminating in lead represent the decay chain products of long-lived primordial 238U, 235U, and 232Th, respectively. However, each of them also occurs, to some extent, as primordial isotopes that were made in supernovae, rather than radiogenically as daughter products. The fixed ratio of lead-204 to the primordial amounts of the other lead isotopes may be used as the baseline to estimate the extra amounts of radiogenic lead present in rocks as a result of decay from uranium and thorium. (See lead–lead dating and uranium–lead dating).

The longest-lived radioisotopes are 205Pb with a half-life of 17.3 million years and 202Pb with a half-life of 52,500 years. A shorter-lived naturally occurring radioisotope, 210Pb with a half-life of 22.2 years, is useful for studying the sedimentation chronology of environmental samples on time scales shorter than 100 years.

The relative abundances of the four stable isotopes are approximately 1.5%, 24%, 22%, and 52.5%, combining to give a standard atomic weight (abundance-weighted average of the stable isotopes) of 207.2(1). Lead is the element with the heaviest stable isotope, 208Pb. (The more massive 209Bi, long considered to be stable, actually has a half-life of 2.01×1019 years.) 208Pb is also a doubly magic isotope, as it has 82 protons and 126 neutrons. It is the heaviest doubly magic nuclide known. A total of 43 lead isotopes are now known, including very unstable synthetic species.

The four primordial isotopes of lead are all observationally stable, meaning that they are predicted to undergo radioactive decay but no decay has been observed yet. These four isotopes are predicted to undergo alpha decay and become isotopes of mercury which are themselves radioactive or observationally stable. 

In its fully ionized state, the isotope 205Pb also becomes stable.

List of isotopes 

|-
| 178Pb
|
| style="text-align:right" | 82
| style="text-align:right" | 96
| 178.003830(26)
| 0.23(15) ms
| α
| 174Hg
| 0+
|
|
|-
| 179Pb
|
| style="text-align:right" | 82
| style="text-align:right" | 97
| 179.00215(21)#
| 3.9(1.1) ms
| α
| 175Hg
| (9/2−)
|
|
|-
| 180Pb
|
| style="text-align:right" | 82
| style="text-align:right" | 98
| 179.997918(22)
| 4.5(11) ms
| α
| 176Hg
| 0+
|
|
|-
| rowspan=2|181Pb
| rowspan=2|
| rowspan=2 style="text-align:right" | 82
| rowspan=2 style="text-align:right" | 99
| rowspan=2|180.99662(10)
| rowspan=2|45(20) ms
| α (98%)
| 177Hg
| rowspan=2|(9/2−)
| rowspan=2|
| rowspan=2|
|-
| β+ (2%)
| 181Tl
|-
| rowspan=2|182Pb
| rowspan=2|
| rowspan=2 style="text-align:right" | 82
| rowspan=2 style="text-align:right" | 100
| rowspan=2|181.992672(15)
| rowspan=2|60(40) ms[55(+40−35) ms]
| α (98%)
| 178Hg
| rowspan=2|0+
| rowspan=2|
| rowspan=2|
|-
| β+ (2%)
| 182Tl
|-
| rowspan=2|183Pb
| rowspan=2|
| rowspan=2 style="text-align:right" | 82
| rowspan=2 style="text-align:right" | 101
| rowspan=2|182.99187(3)
| rowspan=2|535(30) ms
| α (94%)
| 179Hg
| rowspan=2|(3/2−)
| rowspan=2|
| rowspan=2|
|-
| β+ (6%)
| 183Tl
|-
| rowspan=2 style="text-indent:1em" | 183mPb
| rowspan=2|
| rowspan=2 colspan="3" style="text-indent:2em" | 94(8) keV
| rowspan=2|415(20) ms
| α
| 179Hg
| rowspan=2|(13/2+)
| rowspan=2|
| rowspan=2|
|-
| β+ (rare)
| 183Tl
|-
| rowspan=2|184Pb
| rowspan=2|
| rowspan=2 style="text-align:right" | 82
| rowspan=2 style="text-align:right" | 102
| rowspan=2|183.988142(15)
| rowspan=2|490(25) ms
| α
| 180Hg
| rowspan=2|0+
| rowspan=2|
| rowspan=2|
|-
| β+ (rare)
| 184Tl
|-
| rowspan=2|185Pb
| rowspan=2|
| rowspan=2 style="text-align:right" | 82
| rowspan=2 style="text-align:right" | 103
| rowspan=2|184.987610(17)
| rowspan=2|6.3(4) s
| α
| 181Hg
| rowspan=2|3/2−
| rowspan=2|
| rowspan=2|
|-
| β+ (rare)
| 185Tl
|-
| rowspan=2 style="text-indent:1em" | 185mPb
| rowspan=2|
| rowspan=2 colspan="3" style="text-indent:2em" | 60(40)# keV
| rowspan=2|4.07(15) s
| α
| 181Hg
| rowspan=2|13/2+
| rowspan=2|
| rowspan=2|
|-
| β+ (rare)
| 185Tl
|-
| rowspan=2|186Pb
| rowspan=2|
| rowspan=2 style="text-align:right" | 82
| rowspan=2 style="text-align:right" | 104
| rowspan=2|185.984239(12)
| rowspan=2|4.82(3) s
| α (56%)
| 182Hg
| rowspan=2|0+
| rowspan=2|
| rowspan=2|
|-
| β+ (44%)
| 186Tl
|-
| rowspan=2|187Pb
| rowspan=2|
| rowspan=2 style="text-align:right" | 82
| rowspan=2 style="text-align:right" | 105
| rowspan=2|186.983918(9)
| rowspan=2|15.2(3) s
| β+
| 187Tl
| rowspan=2|(3/2−)
| rowspan=2|
| rowspan=2|
|-
| α
| 183Hg
|-
| rowspan=2 style="text-indent:1em" | 187mPb
| rowspan=2|
| rowspan=2 colspan="3" style="text-indent:2em" | 11(11) keV
| rowspan=2|18.3(3) s
| β+ (98%)
| 187Tl
| rowspan=2|(13/2+)
| rowspan=2|
| rowspan=2|
|-
| α (2%)
| 183Hg
|-
| rowspan=2|188Pb
| rowspan=2|
| rowspan=2 style="text-align:right" | 82
| rowspan=2 style="text-align:right" | 106
| rowspan=2|187.980874(11)
| rowspan=2|25.5(1) s
| β+ (91.5%)
| 188Tl
| rowspan=2|0+
| rowspan=2|
| rowspan=2|
|-
| α (8.5%)
| 184Hg
|-
| style="text-indent:1em" | 188m1Pb
|
| colspan="3" style="text-indent:2em" | 2578.2(7) keV
| 830(210) ns
|
|
| (8−)
|
|
|-
| style="text-indent:1em" | 188m2Pb
|
| colspan="3" style="text-indent:2em" | 2800(50) keV
| 797(21) ns
|
|
|
|
|
|-
| 189Pb
|
| style="text-align:right" | 82
| style="text-align:right" | 107
| 188.98081(4)
| 51(3) s
| β+
| 189Tl
| (3/2−)
|
|
|-
| rowspan=2 style="text-indent:1em" | 189m1Pb
| rowspan=2|
| rowspan=2 colspan="3" style="text-indent:2em" | 40(30)# keV
| rowspan=2|50.5(2.1) s
| β+ (99.6%)
| 189Tl
| rowspan=2|13/2+
| rowspan=2|
| rowspan=2|
|-
| α (.4%)
| 185Hg
|-
| style="text-indent:1em" | 189m2Pb
|
| colspan="3" style="text-indent:2em" | 2475(30)# keV
| 26(5) μs
|
|
| (10)+
|
|
|-
| rowspan=2|190Pb
| rowspan=2|
| rowspan=2 style="text-align:right" | 82
| rowspan=2 style="text-align:right" | 108
| rowspan=2|189.978082(13)
| rowspan=2|71(1) s
| β+ (99.1%)
| 190Tl
| rowspan=2|0+
| rowspan=2|
| rowspan=2|
|-
| α (.9%)
| 186Hg
|-
| style="text-indent:1em" | 190m1Pb
|
| colspan="3" style="text-indent:2em" | 2614.8(8) keV
| 150 ns
|
|
| (10)+
|
|
|-
| style="text-indent:1em" | 190m2Pb
|
| colspan="3" style="text-indent:2em" | 2618(20) keV
| 25 μs
|
|
| (12+)
|
|
|-
| style="text-indent:1em" | 190m3Pb
|
| colspan="3" style="text-indent:2em" | 2658.2(8) keV
| 7.2(6) μs
|
|
| (11)−
|
|
|-
| rowspan=2|191Pb
| rowspan=2|
| rowspan=2 style="text-align:right" | 82
| rowspan=2 style="text-align:right" | 109
| rowspan=2|190.97827(4)
| rowspan=2|1.33(8) min
| β+ (99.987%)
| 191Tl
| rowspan=2|(3/2−)
| rowspan=2|
| rowspan=2|
|-
| α (.013%)
| 187Hg
|-
| rowspan=2 style="text-indent:1em" | 191mPb
| rowspan=2|
| rowspan=2 colspan="3" style="text-indent:2em" | 20(50) keV
| rowspan=2|2.18(8) min
| β+ (99.98%)
| 191Tl
| rowspan=2|13/2(+)
| rowspan=2|
| rowspan=2|
|-
| α (.02%)
| 187Hg
|-
| rowspan=2|192Pb
| rowspan=2|
| rowspan=2 style="text-align:right" | 82
| rowspan=2 style="text-align:right" | 110
| rowspan=2|191.975785(14)
| rowspan=2|3.5(1) min
| β+ (99.99%)
| 192Tl
| rowspan=2|0+
| rowspan=2|
| rowspan=2|
|-
| α (.0061%)
| 188Hg
|-
| style="text-indent:1em" | 192m1Pb
|
| colspan="3" style="text-indent:2em" | 2581.1(1) keV
| 164(7) ns
|
|
| (10)+
|
|
|-
| style="text-indent:1em" | 192m2Pb
|
| colspan="3" style="text-indent:2em" | 2625.1(11) keV
| 1.1(5) μs
|
|
| (12+)
|
|
|-
| style="text-indent:1em" | 192m3Pb
|
| colspan="3" style="text-indent:2em" | 2743.5(4) keV
| 756(21) ns
|
|
| (11)−
|
|
|-
| 193Pb
|
| style="text-align:right" | 82
| style="text-align:right" | 111
| 192.97617(5)
| 5# min
| β+
| 193Tl
| (3/2−)
|
|
|-
| style="text-indent:1em" | 193m1Pb
|
| colspan="3" style="text-indent:2em" | 130(80)# keV
| 5.8(2) min
| β+
| 193Tl
| 13/2(+)
|
|
|-
| style="text-indent:1em" | 193m2Pb
|
| colspan="3" style="text-indent:2em" | 2612.5(5)+X keV
| 135(+25−15) ns
|
|
| (33/2+)
|
|
|-
| rowspan=2|194Pb
| rowspan=2|
| rowspan=2 style="text-align:right" | 82
| rowspan=2 style="text-align:right" | 112
| rowspan=2|193.974012(19)
| rowspan=2|12.0(5) min
| β+ (100%)
| 194Tl
| rowspan=2|0+
| rowspan=2|
| rowspan=2|
|-
| α (7.3×10−6%)
| 190Hg
|-
| 195Pb
|
| style="text-align:right" | 82
| style="text-align:right" | 113
| 194.974542(25)
| ~15 min
| β+
| 195Tl
| 3/2#-
|
|
|-
| style="text-indent:1em" | 195m1Pb
|
| colspan="3" style="text-indent:2em" | 202.9(7) keV
| 15.0(12) min
| β+
| 195Tl
| 13/2+
|
|
|-
| style="text-indent:1em" | 195m2Pb
|
| colspan="3" style="text-indent:2em" | 1759.0(7) keV
| 10.0(7) μs
|
|
| 21/2−
|
|
|-
| rowspan=2|196Pb
| rowspan=2|
| rowspan=2 style="text-align:right" | 82
| rowspan=2 style="text-align:right" | 114
| rowspan=2|195.972774(15)
| rowspan=2|37(3) min
| β+
| 196Tl
| rowspan=2|0+
| rowspan=2|
| rowspan=2|
|-
| α (3×10−5%)
| 192Hg
|-
| style="text-indent:1em" | 196m1Pb
|
| colspan="3" style="text-indent:2em" | 1049.20(9) keV
| <100 ns
|
|
| 2+
|
|
|-
| style="text-indent:1em" | 196m2Pb
|
| colspan="3" style="text-indent:2em" | 1738.27(12) keV
| <1 μs
|
|
| 4+
|
|
|-
| style="text-indent:1em" | 196m3Pb
|
| colspan="3" style="text-indent:2em" | 1797.51(14) keV
| 140(14) ns
|
|
| 5−
|
|
|-
| style="text-indent:1em" | 196m4Pb
|
| colspan="3" style="text-indent:2em" | 2693.5(5) keV
| 270(4) ns
|
|
| (12+)
|
|
|-
| 197Pb
|
| style="text-align:right" | 82
| style="text-align:right" | 115
| 196.973431(6)
| 8.1(17) min
| β+
| 197Tl
| 3/2−
|
|
|-
| rowspan=3 style="text-indent:1em" | 197m1Pb
| rowspan=3|
| rowspan=3 colspan="3" style="text-indent:2em" | 319.31(11) keV
| rowspan=3|42.9(9) min
| β+ (81%)
| 197Tl
| rowspan=3|13/2+
| rowspan=3|
| rowspan=3|
|-
| IT (19%)
| 197Pb
|-
| α (3×10−4%)
| 193Hg
|-
| style="text-indent:1em" | 197m2Pb
|
| colspan="3" style="text-indent:2em" | 1914.10(25) keV
| 1.15(20) μs
|
|
| 21/2−
|
|
|-
| 198Pb
|
| style="text-align:right" | 82
| style="text-align:right" | 116
| 197.972034(16)
| 2.4(1) h
| β+
| 198Tl
| 0+
|
|
|-
| style="text-indent:1em" | 198m1Pb
|
| colspan="3" style="text-indent:2em" | 2141.4(4) keV
| 4.19(10) μs
|
|
| (7)−
|
|
|-
| style="text-indent:1em" | 198m2Pb
|
| colspan="3" style="text-indent:2em" | 2231.4(5) keV
| 137(10) ns
|
|
| (9)−
|
|
|-
| style="text-indent:1em" | 198m3Pb
|
| colspan="3" style="text-indent:2em" | 2820.5(7) keV
| 212(4) ns
|
|
| (12)+
|
|
|-
| 199Pb
|
| style="text-align:right" | 82
| style="text-align:right" | 117
| 198.972917(28)
| 90(10) min
| β+
| 199Tl
| 3/2−
|
|
|-
| rowspan=2 style="text-indent:1em" | 199m1Pb
| rowspan=2|
| rowspan=2 colspan="3" style="text-indent:2em" | 429.5(27) keV
| rowspan=2|12.2(3) min
| IT (93%)
| 199Pb
| rowspan=2|(13/2+)
| rowspan=2|
| rowspan=2|
|-
| β+ (7%)
| 199Tl
|-
| style="text-indent:1em" | 199m2Pb
|
| colspan="3" style="text-indent:2em" | 2563.8(27) keV
| 10.1(2) μs
|
|
| (29/2−)
|
|
|-
| 200Pb
|
| style="text-align:right" | 82
| style="text-align:right" | 118
| 199.971827(12)
| 21.5(4) h
| β+
| 200Tl
| 0+
|
|
|-
| rowspan=2|201Pb
| rowspan=2|
| rowspan=2 style="text-align:right" | 82
| rowspan=2 style="text-align:right" | 119
| rowspan=2|200.972885(24)
| rowspan=2|9.33(3) h
| EC (99%)
| rowspan=2| 201Tl
| rowspan=2|5/2−
| rowspan=2|
| rowspan=2|
|-
| β+ (1%)
|-
| style="text-indent:1em" | 201m1Pb
|
| colspan="3" style="text-indent:2em" | 629.14(17) keV
| 61(2) s
|
|
| 13/2+
|
|
|-
| style="text-indent:1em" | 201m2Pb
|
| colspan="3" style="text-indent:2em" | 2718.5+X keV
| 508(5) ns
|
|
| (29/2−)
|
|
|-
| rowspan=2|202Pb
| rowspan=2|
| rowspan=2 style="text-align:right" | 82
| rowspan=2 style="text-align:right" | 120
| rowspan=2|201.972159(9)
| rowspan=2|5.25(28)×104 y
| EC (99%)
| 202Tl
| rowspan=2|0+
| rowspan=2|
| rowspan=2|
|-
| α (1%)
| 198Hg
|-
| rowspan=2 style="text-indent:1em" | 202m1Pb
| rowspan=2|
| rowspan=2 colspan="3" style="text-indent:2em" | 2169.83(7) keV
| rowspan=2|3.53(1) h
| IT (90.5%)
| 202Pb
| rowspan=2|9−
| rowspan=2|
| rowspan=2|
|-
| EC (9.5%)
| 202Tl
|-
| style="text-indent:1em" | 202m2Pb
|
| colspan="3" style="text-indent:2em" | 4142.9(11) keV
| 110(5) ns
|
|
| (16+)
|
|
|-
| style="text-indent:1em" | 202m3Pb
|
| colspan="3" style="text-indent:2em" | 5345.9(13) keV
| 107(5) ns
|
|
| (19−)
|
|
|-
| 203Pb
|
| style="text-align:right" | 82
| style="text-align:right" | 121
| 202.973391(7)
| 51.873(9) h
| EC
| 203Tl
| 5/2−
|
|
|-
| style="text-indent:1em" | 203m1Pb
|
| colspan="3" style="text-indent:2em" | 825.20(9) keV
| 6.21(8) s
| IT
| 203Pb
| 13/2+
|
|
|-
| style="text-indent:1em" | 203m2Pb
|
| colspan="3" style="text-indent:2em" | 2949.47(22) keV
| 480(7) ms
|
|
| 29/2−
|
|
|-
| style="text-indent:1em" | 203m3Pb
|
| colspan="3" style="text-indent:2em" | 2923.4+X keV
| 122(4) ns
|
|
| (25/2−)
|
|
|-
| 204Pb
|
| style="text-align:right" | 82
| style="text-align:right" | 122
| 203.9730436(13)
| colspan="3" style="text-align:center;"|Observationally Stable
| 0+
| 0.014(1)
| 0.0104–0.0165
|-
| style="text-indent:1em" | 204m1Pb
|
| colspan="3" style="text-indent:2em" | 1274.00(4) keV
| 265(10) ns
|
|
| 4+
|
|
|-
| style="text-indent:1em" | 204m2Pb
|
| colspan="3" style="text-indent:2em" | 2185.79(5) keV
| 67.2(3) min
|
|
| 9−
|
|
|-
| style="text-indent:1em" | 204m3Pb
|
| colspan="3" style="text-indent:2em" | 2264.33(4) keV
| 0.45(+10−3) μs
|
|
| 7−
|
|
|-
| 205Pb
|
| style="text-align:right" | 82
| style="text-align:right" | 123
| 204.9744818(13)
| 1.73(7)×107 y
| EC
| 205Tl
| 5/2−
|
|
|-
| style="text-indent:1em" | 205m1Pb
|
| colspan="3" style="text-indent:2em" | 2.329(7) keV
| 24.2(4) μs
|
|
| 1/2−
|
|
|-
| style="text-indent:1em" | 205m2Pb
|
| colspan="3" style="text-indent:2em" | 1013.839(13) keV
| 5.55(2) ms
|
|
| 13/2+
|
|
|-
| style="text-indent:1em" | 205m3Pb
|
| colspan="3" style="text-indent:2em" | 3195.7(5) keV
| 217(5) ns
|
|
| 25/2−
|
|
|-
| 206Pb
| Radium G
| style="text-align:right" | 82
| style="text-align:right" | 124
| 205.9744653(13)
| colspan="3" style="text-align:center;"|Observationally Stable
| 0+
| 0.241(1)
| 0.2084–0.2748
|-
| style="text-indent:1em" | 206m1Pb
|
| colspan="3" style="text-indent:2em" | 2200.14(4) keV
| 125(2) μs
|
|
| 7−
|
|
|-
| style="text-indent:1em" | 206m2Pb
|
| colspan="3" style="text-indent:2em" | 4027.3(7) keV
| 202(3) ns
|
|
| 12+
|
|
|-
| 207Pb
| Actinium D
| style="text-align:right" | 82
| style="text-align:right" | 125
| 206.9758969(13)
| colspan="3" style="text-align:center;"|Observationally Stable
| 1/2−
| 0.221(1)
| 0.1762–0.2365
|-
| style="text-indent:1em" | 207mPb
|
| colspan="3" style="text-indent:2em" | 1633.368(5) keV
| 806(6) ms
| IT
| 207Pb
| 13/2+
|
|
|-
| 208Pb
| Thorium D
| style="text-align:right" | 82
| style="text-align:right" | 126
| 207.9766521(13)
| colspan="3" style="text-align:center;"|Observationally Stable
| 0+
| 0.524(1)
| 0.5128–0.5621
|-
| style="text-indent:1em" | 208mPb
|
| colspan="3" style="text-indent:2em" | 4895(2) keV
| 500(10) ns
|
|
| 10+
|
|
|-
| 209Pb
|
| style="text-align:right" | 82
| style="text-align:right" | 127
| 208.9810901(19)
| 3.253(14) h
| β−
| 209Bi
| 9/2+
| Trace
|
|-
| rowspan=2|210Pb
| rowspan=2|Radium DRadioleadRadio-lead
| rowspan=2 style="text-align:right" | 82
| rowspan=2 style="text-align:right" | 128
| rowspan=2|209.9841885(16)
| rowspan=2|22.20(22) y
| β− (100%)
| 210Bi
| rowspan=2|0+
| rowspan=2|Trace
| rowspan=2|
|-
| α (1.9×10−6%)
| 206Hg
|-
| style="text-indent:1em" | 210mPb
|
| colspan="3" style="text-indent:2em" | 1278(5) keV
| 201(17) ns
|
|
| 8+
|
|
|-
| 211Pb
| Actinium B
| style="text-align:right" | 82
| style="text-align:right" | 129
| 210.9887370(29)
| 36.1(2) min
| β−
| 211Bi
| 9/2+
| Trace
|
|-
| 212Pb
| Thorium B
| style="text-align:right" | 82
| style="text-align:right" | 130
| 211.9918975(24)
| 10.64(1) h
| β−
| 212Bi
| 0+
| Trace
|
|-
| style="text-indent:1em" | 212mPb
|
| colspan="3" style="text-indent:2em" | 1335(10) keV
| 6.0(0.8) μs
| IT
| 212Pb
| (8+)
|
|
|-
| 213Pb
|
| style="text-align:right" | 82
| style="text-align:right" | 131
| 212.996581(8)
| 10.2(3) min
| β−
| 213Bi
| (9/2+)
|
|
|-
| 214Pb
| Radium B
| style="text-align:right" | 82
| style="text-align:right" | 132
| 213.9998054(26)
| 26.8(9) min
| β−
| 214Bi
| 0+
| Trace
|
|-
| style="text-indent:1em" | 214mPb
|
| colspan="3" style="text-indent:2em" | 1420(20) keV
| 6.2(0.3) μs
| IT
| 212Pb
| 8+#
|
|
|-
| 215Pb
|
| style="text-align:right" | 82
| style="text-align:right" | 133
| 215.004660(60)
| 2.34(0.19) min
| β−
| 215Bi
| 9/2+#
|
|
|-
| 216Pb
|
| style="text-align:right" | 82
| style="text-align:right" | 134
| 216.008030(210)#
| 1.65(0.2) min
| β−
| 216Bi
| 0+
|
|
|-
| style="text-indent:1em" | 216mPb
|
| colspan="3" style="text-indent:2em" | 1514(20) keV
| 400(40) ns
| IT
| 216Pb
| 8+#
|
|
|-
| 217Pb
|
| style="text-align:right" | 82
| style="text-align:right" | 135
| 217.013140(320)#
| 20(5) s
| β−
| 217Bi
| 9/2+#
|
|
|-
| 218Pb
|
| style="text-align:right" | 82
| style="text-align:right" | 136
| 218.016590(320)#
| 15(7) s
| β−
| 218Bi
| 0+
|
|

Lead-206

206Pb is the final step in the decay chain of 238U, the "radium series" or "uranium series". In a closed system, over time, a given mass of 238U will decay in a sequence of steps culminating in 206Pb. The production of intermediate products eventually reaches an equilibrium (though this takes a long time, as the half-life of 234U is 245,500 years). Once this stabilized system is reached, the ratio of 238U to 206Pb will steadily decrease, while the ratios of the other intermediate products to each other remain constant.

Like most radioisotopes found in the radium series, 206Pb was initially named as a variation of radium, specifically radium G. It is the decay product of both 210Po (historically called radium F) by alpha decay, and the much rarer 206Tl (radium EII) by beta decay.

Lead-206 has been proposed for use in fast breeder nuclear fission reactor coolant over the use of natural lead mixture (which also includes other stable lead isotopes) as a mechanism to improve neutron economy and greatly suppress unwanted production of highly radioactive byproducts.

Lead-204, -207, and -208

204Pb is entirely primordial, and is thus useful for estimating the fraction of the other lead isotopes in a given sample that are also primordial, since the relative fractions of the various primordial lead isotopes is constant everywhere. Any excess lead-206, -207, and -208 is thus assumed to be radiogenic in origin, allowing various uranium and thorium dating schemes to be used to estimate the age of rocks (time since their formation) based on the relative abundance of lead-204 to other isotopes.

207Pb is the end of the actinium series from 235U.

208Pb is the end of the thorium series from 232Th. While it only makes up approximately half of the composition of lead in most places on Earth, it can be found naturally enriched up to around 90% in thorium ores. 208Pb is the heaviest known stable nuclide and also the heaviest known doubly magic nucleus, as Z = 82 and N = 126 correspond to closed nuclear shells. As a consequence of this particularly stable configuration, its neutron capture cross section is very low (even lower than that of deuterium in the thermal spectrum), making it of interest for lead-cooled fast reactors.

Lead-212 

212Pb-containing radiopharmaceuticals have been trialed as therapeutic agents for the experimental cancer treatment targeted alpha-particle therapy.

References 

Isotope masses from:

Isotopic compositions and standard atomic masses from:

Half-life, spin, and isomer data selected from the following sources.

 
Lead
Lead